Return to Dust is a Chinese drama film written and directed by Li Ruijun. It had its world premiere at Berlinale 2022. It is in Mandarin Chinese with a run time of 133 minutes. It premiered in the United Kingdom at the Edinburgh International Film Festival in August 2022, and will go on general release in November. As of September 2022 the film had made 100 million yuan (US$14 million)  at the box office, on a budget of 2 million yuan. 

The film was pulled from streaming services in China on September 26, 2022. Western news outlets such as Radio Free Asia reported that mentioning the film on Weibo had been banned. It was later reported by the South China Morning Post that discussion about the film had not been prohibited on Chinese social media, but the reason for the film's removal from streaming services had not been made clear. Other sources later reported that posts about the film were blocked on Weibo, suggesting that there was a ban on mentioning the film after all. Prior to its recall, a version of the film with an alternative ending was available.

Synopsis 
The story follows the lives of Ma Youtie and Cao Guiying in rural Gansu throughout the year of 2011. Guiying is disabled, incontinent and infertile, has been mistreated by her family, and is past the normal age by which women are normally expected to be married in rural China. Their families arrange their marriage, and they develop a closeness and later fall in love. They lead a simple life farming with their donkey. There are multiple empty properties in their hometown and they move into one of them.  A government incentive of a large cash payment to farmers who allow their poorly built and unoccupied houses to be demolished is lucrative for their owners who have migrated to China's cities in search of work. Each time the house they occupy is demolished, Youtie and Guiying move to another unoccupied property until they decide to build their own better and larger homestead. They use mud bricks which they make themselves, and old wooden posts salvaged from the demolitions. A local businessman has a health emergency and requires blood transfusions.  Youtie is told that he shares the same rare blood type and is frequently called to donate blood to save the businessman's life. In return for his blood donations, the businessman's wealthy family offers Youtie cheap gifts, which he respectfully declines because he thinks that they are too lavish. The government for propaganda purposes allocates Youtie and Guiying a new apartment in a high-rise building in the town, but Youtie and Guiying find it impractical because the apartment cannot house their farm animals. Guiying becomes ill and Youtie tells her to rest in bed while he goes out to work. Youtie is shown later that day passing a group of locals sitting unconcernedly by the irrigation canal. They tell him that Guiying had been looking for him to give him some food, but that she felt dizzy and fell into the water and drowned. The locals had not helped her nor removed her body. Youtie is devastated and jumps into the canal to retrieve Guiying's body. Youtie quietly finishes his harvest in the coming days, then frees his faithful hard-working donkey and sells all his possessions to settle his debts, keeping nothing aside as he would normally do for the coming season's planting. Even in this final transaction Youtie is cheated by the buyer who forces him to round down the price "to make the book-keeping easier". When preparing Guiying's body for burial, Youtie presses some grains of corn to make a mark in her hand, which an earlier scene explains meant that he felt he could always find her. The implication is that he wants to join her in death. Youtie takes poison, and lies down, specially positioning his head at the side of the bed to be near to the smouldering charcoal which he has lit to give off carbon monoxide fumes. His body shakes uncontrollably. The camera pans to an ear of corn that he is holding, which gently bends this way and that. Youtie's few remaining belongings are shown being taken away in a handcart, while payment is made from a government official to Youtie's brother for permission to demolish the house which Youtie and Guiying had built and where they had lived happily for a brief while. The donkey is shown as having returned to the house by himself, but is ignored, unwanted by anyone.

Note about the ending 
The film became a target for China's censors, and some changes were imposed upon the ending. When the locals tell Youtie that Guiying has drowned, it is not clear exactly how much earlier this had happened: the editing suggests that it had only just that moment happened, but Guiying is dead and has clearly been floating in the water for some while, and none of the locals had helped or removed her body, and are all sitting there calmly. In his final scene, Youtie is not shown drinking the poison, but the bottle is shown on the altar that he has made for Guiying. In the next and final scene, when the house is being demolished, two lines of dialogue have been added, as if from one character to another in shot, stating that Youtie will now be moving to his new apartment in the city. This makes no sense in the context of the previous scene, and it's clear that the people on screen are not talking to each other: they are not even looking at each other, and in any case a voice would not be heard above the noise of the demolition machinery. Before the film was removed from streaming platforms in China, the revised version added a line of text at this point before the credits begin. It says (in Chinese): "Ma Youtie moved to his new home in the winter of 2011 and started his new life with the help of the government and the warm-hearted villagers."

Cast and crew

Production
In order to make the film cast and crew had to live in a remote town in the northwest of Gansu and Hai Qing, who is an acclaimed film star in China, actually lived with Wu Renlin who is a local man who is an untrained actor.  Hai was taught the skills required to be a farmer and participated in the mud brick house building. Hai also learned the local dialect. Wu normally works as a farmer.

Accolades 

|-
| rowspan = "2" align = "center" | 2022 || 72nd Berlin International Film Festival ||   Golden Bear||Return to Dust ||  || 
|-
| 67th Valladolid International Film Festival || colspan = "2" | Golden Spike ||  || 
|}

References

External links
 

2022 films
2022 drama films
Chinese drama films
2020s Mandarin-language films
Films directed by Li Ruijun
Films set in Gansu
Films shot in Gansu